The Secret of Wildcat Swamp is Volume 31 in the original The Hardy Boys Mystery Stories published by Grosset & Dunlap.

This book was written for the Stratemeyer Syndicate by William Dougherty in 1952. Between 1959 and 1973 the first 38 volumes of this series were systematically revised as part of a project directed by Harriet Adams, Edward Stratemeyer's daughter. The original version of this book was shortened in 1969 by Priscilla Baker-Carr resulting in two slightly different stories sharing the same title.

Plot summary
An invitation from Cap Bailey, science teacher at Bayport High, to accompany him out West to Wildcat Swamp on an archaeological expedition triggers off a series of dangerous events for Frank and Joe Hardy. On their way West the boys and Cap have a near-fatal accident in a private plane which has been sabotaged. Though warned to leave the area, Frank, Joe, and Cap doggedly remain until they have caught the cunning ex-convicts they are up against in this swift-paced adventure.<re

References

The Hardy Boys books
1952 American novels
1952 children's books
1969 American novels
1969 children's books
Grosset & Dunlap books